Goniodiscaster is a genus of sea stars in the family Oreasteridae.

Selected species
 Goniodiscaster acanthodes H.L.Clark, 1938
 Goniodiscaster australiae Tortonese, 1937
 Goniodiscaster bicolor H.L.Clark, 1938
 Goniodiscaster foraminatus (Döderlein, 1916)
 Goniodiscaster forficulatus (Perrier, 1875)
 Goniodiscaster granuliferus (J.E.Gray, 1847)
 Goniodiscaster insignis (Koehler, 1910)
 Goniodiscaster integer Livingstone, 1931
 Goniodiscaster pleyadella (Lamarck, 1816)
 Goniodiscaster porosus (Koehler, 1910)
 Goniodiscaster rugosus (Perrier, 1875)
 Goniodiscaster scaber (Möbius, 1859)
 Goniodiscaster seriatus (Müller & Troschel, 1843)
 Goniodiscaster vallei (Koehler, 1910)
 List source :

References

Oreasteridae
Taxa named by Hubert Lyman Clark